The Chartered Management Institute (CMI) is a professional institution for management based in the United Kingdom. It was founded as the British Institute of Management (BIM) in 1947 or 1948, merged with the Institution of Industrial Managers (IIM) in 1992 to form the Institute of Management (IM), and gained a royal charter, and its present name, in 2002.

The major membership classes are Member, Fellow - for those with significant expertise - and Companion - the most senior grade.

In addition to supporting its members, the organisation encourages management development, carries out research, produces a wide variety of publications on management interests, and publishes the official members' magazine, Professional Manager.  The institute also engages with government and other public bodies concerning policy on management and business related issues. Professional Manager magazine is circulated to over 80,000 members of the CMI.

Chartered Manager (CMgr) 

The Chartered Manager process requires candidates to demonstrate how they have developed as a manager and how they have applied their leadership and management skills to achieve significant business impact.

There are two routes to becoming Chartered:
 Exemption Route - Available to those who have completed a CMI Level 5 Diploma or above.
 Qualified Route - Available to those who hold a degree level management qualification or who have minimum of five years of relevant experience.

Criteria and requirements for chartered status in the UK have to be approved by the Privy Council; as such the criteria for Chartered Manager designation are "broadly similar" to chartered statuses in other fields.

History 
Timeline

1945 - Sir Stafford Cripps, the president of the Board of Trade appointed a Committee, under the chairmanship of Sir Clive Baillieu (president of the Federation of British Industries - the forerunner of the CBS) to formulate detailed proposals for the establishment of a central institution for all aspects related to management. One of the reasons behind this move was the realisation that, although there were professional bodies representing functional activities, there was no comparable body for general management thinking and for the development and promotion of better management.
1947 or 1948 - Following the recommendations of the Baillieu Report, the British Institute of Management (BIM) was formed (sources differ as to the exact year).
1951 - The UK's first Diploma in Management Studies was introduced by the BIM and the Ministry of Education.
1987 - The BIM, in conjunction with other bodies, issued two pivotal reports, The making of British managers (John Constable and Roger McCormick), and The making of managers (Charles Handy).  These reports led to the formation of the National Forum for Management Education and Development (NFMED) and, subsequently, the Management Charter Initiative (MCI), which spearheaded the issue of the world's first competency-based national management standards.
1992 - BIM merged with the Institution of Industrial Managers (IIM) to form the Institute of Management (IM).  The awarding body status of the IIM was transferred to the new Institute.
2000 - The Institute accredited its 250th approved centre to deliver IM management qualifications.
2001 - The Institute of Interim Management was formed as a Special Interest Group within the Institute of Management.
2002 - The Institute of Management was awarded a Royal Charter and became the Chartered Management Institute.
2002 - The institute's management qualifications were recognised as part of the UK's National Qualifications Framework for Higher Education.
2002 - The Institute of Interim Management by mutual agreement with the CMI, gained an independent status.
2003 - The Chartered Manager designation was launched.
2005 - The Institute of Management Consultancy (IMC) became an 'organisation within the Institute'
2005 – The institute assumed the presidency of the European Management Association (EMA) for a three-year term
2005 - The institute's first National Convention is held at the Queen's Hotel in Leeds
2006 – The Institute of Business Advisers (IBA) became an 'organisation with the Institute' and discussions commenced with a view to achieving a merger between IBA and IMC by mid-2007
2007 - National Convention held in Birmingham at the Hilton Metropole
2007 - IBA becomes IBC, the Institute of Business Consulting
2008 - Ruth Spellman is appointed Chief Executive
2008 - National Convention held in Birmingham at the Hilton Metropole
2009 - National Convention held in London at the London Hilton Metropole.
2011 - Ruth Spellman suddenly leaves CMI in August with Christopher Kinsella being appointed as interim CE
2011 - A survey of members, conducted by Huw Hilditch-Roberts, concluded that branches should be scrapped in order to improve engagement with the membership.
2012 - Ann Francke is appointed in June as Chief Executive.
2013 - New Regional Chairmen appointed and Regional Boards elected to take over from branches in October.
2014 - Mike Clasper is appointed as president

Membership 

 Student  - Must be studying a relevant management qualification at any level no.
 Affiliate  - Requires no experience or qualifications.
 Associate (ACMI) - Requires a management qualification at Certificate, Diploma or S/NVQ level OR a minimum of 3 years management experience. This grade carries entitlement to use the designatory letters ACMI.
Member (MCMI) - Requires a management qualification at degree level/equivalent OR a minimum of 5 years management experience. This grade carries entitlement to use the designatory letters MCMI.
Fellow (FCMI) - Requires a management qualification at degree level/equivalent AND a minimum of 10 years’ management experience, three of which must be at a strategic level. This grade carries entitlement to use the designatory letters FCMI and is granted by an Assessment Panel.
Companion (CCMI) - The most senior grade of membership, awarded by invitation only.

Obsolete membership grades include Member of the British Institute of Management (MBIM) etc.

Qualifications

General Management and Leadership 

Each level follows a format whereby a number of credits gained lead to an Award (which develops basic skills and knowledge appropriate to that level), Certificate (covers a broader area and builds on knowledge gained in the award), and Diploma (where a comprehensive range of skills and knowledge are gained. Qualifications are part of the UK's Regulated Qualifications Framework.
Level 2 Award, Certificate & Diploma in Team Leading
Level 3 Award, Certificate & Diploma in First Line Management
Level 4 Award, Certificate & Diploma in Management and Leadership
Level 5 Award, Certificate & Diploma in Management and Leadership
Level 6 Award, Certificate & Diploma in Management and Leadership
Level 7 Award, Certificate & Diploma in Strategic Management and Leadership
Level 8 Award, Certificate & Diploma in Strategic Direction and Leadership

Coaching and Mentoring Awards

The CMI also accredits Coaching and Mentoring qualifications to support the development of coaching and mentoring skills and techniques of individuals, teams and achieve objectives.

Level 3 Award, Certificate & Diploma in Coaching and Mentoring
Level 5 Award, Certificate & Diploma in Coaching and Mentoring
Level 7 Award, Certificate & Diploma in Coaching and Mentoring

N/SVQs 

Level 2 S/NVQ in Team Leading
Level 3 S/NVQ in Management
Level 4 S/NVQ in Management
Level 5 S/NVQ in Management

Management and Leadership qualifications can be accessed through accredited centres. When choosing the correct management qualification to study it is important to first choose the correct level of qualification, which will largely be driven by experience and previous study. Level 5 qualification are foundation degree level equivalent and level 7 equates to postgraduate masters level. Once the correct level of qualification has been chosen it is then possible to decide on the size of the qualification.

See also
The Institute of Leadership and Management
Association of Business Psychologists
 List of professional associations in the United Kingdom
 Canadian Institute of Management
 Ofqual, the Office of Qualifications and Examinations Regulation

References

External links

Management
Management organizations
Post-nominal letters
Organisations based in Northamptonshire
Organizations established in 1947
1947 establishments in the United Kingdom